The 2017 Liberty Bowl was a post-season American college football bowl game played on December 30, 2017, at Liberty Bowl Memorial Stadium in Memphis, Tennessee. The 59th edition of the Liberty Bowl featured the Iowa State Cyclones of the Big 12 Conference against the Memphis Tigers of the American Athletic Conference. It was one of the 2017–18 bowl games concluding the 2017 FBS football season.  Sponsored by automobile parts and accessories store AutoZone, it was officially known as the AutoZone Liberty Bowl.

Teams
The game featured conference tie-ins from the Southeastern Conference and the Big 12 Conference.  However, the SEC did not have enough teams to fill its contractual obligations, so the bowl invited the Memphis Tigers of the American Athletic Conference, the team that occupies the Liberty Bowl during the regular season, thus making the contest—which was the Tigers' first appearance in this bowl—a Memphis home game.  This is the third Liberty Bowl for Iowa State, having previously played in the 1972 and 2012 editions of the game.

Iowa State Cyclones

Memphis Tigers

Game summary

Scoring summary

Statistics

References

2017–18 NCAA football bowl games
2017 12
2017
2017
2017 in sports in Tennessee
December 2017 sports events in the United States